In geometry, the rectified truncated octahedron is a convex polyhedron, constructed as a rectified, truncated octahedron. It has 38 faces: 24 isosceles triangles, 6 squares, and 8 hexagons.

Topologically, the squares corresponding to the octahedron's vertices are always regular, although the hexagons, while having equal edge lengths, do not have the same edge lengths with the squares, having different but alternating angles, causing the triangles to be isosceles instead.

Related polyhedra
The rectified truncated octahedron can be seen in sequence of rectification and truncation operations from the octahedron. Further truncation, and alternation creates two more polyhedra:

See also 
 Rectified truncated tetrahedron
 Rectified truncated cube
 Rectified truncated dodecahedron
 Rectified truncated icosahedron

References

 Coxeter Regular Polytopes, Third edition, (1973), Dover edition,  (pp. 145–154 Chapter 8: Truncation)
 John H. Conway, Heidi Burgiel, Chaim Goodman-Strass, The Symmetries of Things 2008,

External links 
 George Hart's Conway interpreter: generates polyhedra in VRML, taking Conway notation as input

Polyhedra